Trophonofusus is a genus of sea snails, marine gastropod mollusks in the family Fasciolariidae, the spindle snails, the tulip snails and their allies.

Species
Species within the genus Trophonofusus include:
 Trophonofusus muricatoides (Yokoyama, 1920)

References

Fasciolariidae
Monotypic gastropod genera